John Lees Faulkner (c.1812–8 September 1882) was a New Zealand trader, shipbuilder and farmer. He was born in Whitby, Yorkshire, England on c.1812. His wife was Ruawahine Irihapeti Faulkner.

References

1812 births
1882 deaths
New Zealand farmers
New Zealand traders
New Zealand shipbuilders